The Leather Bottle is a pub at 538 Garratt Lane, Earlsfield, London SW17.

It is a Grade II listed building, built in the early 18th century.  The introduction to Samuel Foote's play The Mayor of Garratt mentions the pub, describing Earlsfield's mock Garrat Elections of the 18th century as having been founded by "a party of watermen, belonging to Wandsworth, dining at the Leather Bottle".

References

External links
 
 

Grade II listed pubs in London
Grade II listed buildings in the London Borough of Wandsworth
Pubs in the London Borough of Wandsworth